Statistics of Primera Divisió in the 2004–2005 season.

Overview
It was contested by 8 teams, and UE Sant Julià won the championship.

First round

Second round

Championship Round

Relegation Round

References
 Andorra - List of final tables (RSSSF)

Primera Divisió seasons
Andorra
1